This is a list of Googie architecture structures in the United States which includes a photographic gallery with a brief description of some of the structures. Googie was an original architectural style which began in Southern California during the 1940s. Influenced by the coming of the Space Age, the Googie-themed architecture popularity was most notable from the mid-1940s to early 1970s, among motels, coffee houses and gas stations. The term "Googie" comes from a now defunct coffee shop and cafe built in West Hollywood designed by John Lautner.

List

The following are images of some of the Googie architecture structures remaining in the United States.

Doo Wop ones in New Jersey
A number of postwar motels in New Jersey, including a cluster in The Wildwoods, have been recognized as high-style Moderne architecture, and some or all of these have been termed Doo-Wop and/or Googie in style.  A number of these were studied in a National Register of Historic Places 2001 architectural survey. The Caribbean Motel (1957) is one of those studied which was subsequently listed on the National Register of Historic Places; it and numerous others are listed in the New Jersey-designated Wildwoods Shore Resort Historic District.  The term doo-wop was coined by Cape May's Mid-Atlantic Center for the Arts in the early 1990s to describe the unique, space-age architectural style, which is also referred to as the Googie or populuxe style.

See also

List of Googie architecture structures (Canada)
Googie architecture
Modern architecture

References

Further reading
Googie: Fifties Coffee Shop Architecture; by: Alan Hess; Publisher: Chronicle Books;  .
Googie Redux: Ultramodern Roadside Architecture; by: Alan Hess; Publisher: Chronicle Books;  .

structures
Googie architecture structures
Googie architecture structures
Googie architecture structures
Googie architecture structures
Googie architecture structures